Mohamed Toihiri (born 20 August 1955) was the Permanent Representative to the United Nations for Comoros, (also accredited as ambassador to the United States, Canada and Cuba) between 2007 and 2012. Outside of his ambassadorship, Toihiri is known as Comoros's first published author.

Education
Toihiri attended the University of Bordeaux III, France from 1977 to 1979. Toihiri first received two undergraduate degrees in French and Communications in 1977 and 1978, respectively. After receiving his degrees, he completed a graduate degree in Communications, and a Ph.D. in modern French literature with a concentration in Francophone literature in 1979.

Career
Toihiri had previously worked primarily in the media and academics. He became the director of culture for Radio Comoros in 1978. During his career, he frequently participated in newspapers of Comoros by serving as editor in chief for Le Comorian, and writing articles for Kashkazi and Al-Watwan.

Tolihiri started his academic career in 1978, and held multiple positions. A few of his positions include Academic Director and general director for Comoros. During his career in education, Toihiri briefly worked in Paris as director for public relations for Sony and TDK from 1986 to 1988. Before being appointed to the UN, he held the chair for French literature as senior lecturer in the University of Comoros.

United Nations
On 1 October 2007, Toihiri was named the Permanent Representative to the United Nations for Comoros.

Literature
In 1985, Toihiri wrote a book about Ali Soilih's government called Republique des Imberbes Roman Comorien.

See also

References

1955 births
Living people
Permanent Representatives of the Comoros to the United Nations
Ambassadors of the Comoros to the United States
Ambassadors of the Comoros to Canada
Ambassadors of the Comoros to Cuba
Comorian novelists
20th-century novelists
20th-century male writers